Teresa Cooper is a British author, speaker, and children's rights campaigner against family injustice and child abuse.

Activism
Cooper is known for her eighteen-year campaign fighting for the justice and exposure of one of the most horrific abuses against children in Local Authority and Church of England's care. She was one of the girls drugged, sexually abused and imprisoned in a small room for over 163 days while in care at the Kendall House children's home in Gravesend, Kent, in the 1970s and 1980s. The Kendall House records indicate daily administration of drugs in overdose form, both orally and by intra-muscular injections; sexual infections while incarcerated in the small room inside Kendall House, a large extensive list of psychotropic drugs and drugs for Parkinson's disease—all administered by force. Cooper's Kendall House records also include placebo and tests including urine, blood samples and swabs. Cooper relates that the girls she was with in the home have now had children of their own with birth defects, and that these defects are a direct result of being drugged while at Kendall House.

The story was first revisited in a national newspaper by Adrian Butler of the Sunday Mirror in January 2009.

The story has been covered by Sally Gillen in 2007 reporter at Communitycare Magazine, Review by Liz Davies is senior lecturer children and families social work, London Metropolitan University and blog by Sally Gillen.

Cooper first took her case to Parliament with her then-MP Neil Gerrard in 1994.

Cooper has since received a "substantial out of court settlement" in regard to her civil case against the Church of England.

Bibliography
 Trust No One (2007)

See also
 Anglican Communion sexual abuse cases

References

External links
 - www.no2abuse.com - Kendall house - The London programme 1980 and what the government did know.
 1994 Parliament debateSocial Services Files (Wandsworth) - Miss X
 Sedation 'birth defect risk' - The BBC, April 2009
 Living with the legacy of care
 Sedation link' to birth defects 
 CofE accused of care cover up
 Forced drugging LWT Factual documentary about Kendall House including Sir George Young. Aired in 1980 prior to Teresa Cooper being placed in Kendall House 
 BBC Radio full interview including MP Tim Loughton
 Eric Pickles' abuse victim comment sparks row 2013
 Child abuse victim sent threatening letter claiming to be from Brentwood MP Eric Pickles
 ERIC Pickles has refused to apologise to a victim of childhood abuse
 Confidential Police Email Deliberately leaked To Press by Tory Minister Eric Pickles Office
 'In whose best interest' by Prof Laurie Taylor 1979/1980 on Kendall House and the misuse of drugs on children in care

Anti-psychiatry
Living people
Children's rights activists
Year of birth missing (living people)
Church of England